Lindsay Hansen Park is an American Mormon feminist blogger, podcaster, and the executive director for the Salt Lake City-based non-profit Sunstone Education Foundation. 

Park has self identified as an "Independent Mormon."

Life
Born in 1982, Park was raised in the Church of Jesus Christ of Latter-day Saints, and grew up in the heart of the Salt Lake Valley. Her mother was a public historian, often speaking on pioneer history. She describes her family history: "I grew up very chapel Mormon. My parents are smart people, but we come from seven generations of Mormons, both sides, of poor Danish farmers, basically. We were not the wealthy elite Mormons; We were the stalwart-on-the-ground Mormons, and that is who we are."

Park currently resides in Salt Lake City with her family.

Activism
Park co-founded Utah For Congo to raise awareness for post rape survivors. She has been the Director of Counseling Services for the Whitefields Education Foundation, which "offers professional counseling and resources for Latter-Day Saints struggling with a disruption in their faith identity."

In the media 
Park blogs for Feminist Mormon Housewives (FMH) about women's issues inside and outside of The Church of Jesus Christ of Latter-day Saints. She is the main voice behind FMH's podcast, which has been recommended by New York Times religion reporter Laurie Goodstein. Her work and voice have been referenced in The Wall Street Journal, The Salt Lake Tribune'''s Trib Talk, Salt Lake City Weekly, The Guardian and Quartz.

As the Executive Director of Sunstone, Park has been credited with expanding the Sunstone audience to be more diverse. The 2015 Sunstone Symposium was described as having "many contributors from the millennial generation, racially diverse communities, and non-Americans," along with "the sea of white, gray-haired presenters and participants" that have frequented Sunstone's events throughout its history.

She worked as a consultant on the TV show Under the Banner of Heaven.

Podcasting
 Year of Polygamy 
In 2014, Park founded the Year of Polygamy podcast, where she details the history of Mormon polygamy with particular emphasis on the lives and experiences of women. Starting with individual episodes giving biographical sketches of 34 women who were sealed to Joseph Smith, it goes on to cover the impact of plural marriage on the history of Latter Day Saints in the nineteenth century, and on to the present day continuance of the practice by Mormon fundamentalists.

The podcast was referenced in a New York Times article on Leslie Olpin Petersen's Forgotten Wives'' series of paintings.

Sunstone podcast
In January 2019, Sunstone launched a new family of podcasts. Park has participated in a number of them, both as a guest (reviewing news in Mormonism and introducing Sunstone's equivalent of Firesides) and as a host covering the Mormon context for topics such as women's work with refugees, healing from abuse, the murder of Matthew Shepard, how various Mormon communities can better converse with one another, and history (including the creation story in Mormonism, Lucy Mack Smith, Joseph Smith's siblings, magic and Mormonism, Mormon scriptures, stories from Kirtland, and early “bad boys” in the Mormon movement including Hiram Page, Oliver Cowdery, and William McLellin).

Blogging
For six years, Park blogged at Feminist Mormon Housewives under the pseudonym "Winterbuzz." She published on various topics from critiquing the CES letter to violent Mormon fanatics. Park has blogged at Patheos on topics such as the use of the word "Mormon" and she has also contributed to Quartz.

References

External links
 Lindsay Hansen Park on Twitter
 
 
 
 
 
 
 
 
 
 
 

1982 births
Living people
Writers from Utah
American bloggers
American nonprofit executives
Mormon feminists
Mormon bloggers
Feminist historians
Historians of the Latter Day Saint movement
Date of birth missing (living people)
Place of birth missing (living people)